Michael Peter (born 8 September 1968) is a German rower. He competed in the men's coxed pair event at the 1992 Summer Olympics.

References

External links
 

1968 births
Living people
German male rowers
Olympic rowers of Germany
Rowers at the 1992 Summer Olympics
Place of birth missing (living people)